Rocktown Rollers (RTR) is a women's flat track roller derby league based in Harrisonburg, Virginia. Founded in 2008, the league consists of a single team which competes against teams from other leagues. Rocktown is a member of the Women's Flat Track Derby Association (WFTDA).

History
The league was founded in early 2008 by Janna "Janna-cide" Basye and Troch, two locals. It hosted its first home bout early in 2009, attracting around 500 fans. 

Rocktown was accepted into the Women's Flat Track Derby Association Apprentice Program in July 2010, and became a full member of the WFTDA in June 2011.

WFTDA rankings

NR = no end-of-year rank assigned

References

Harrisonburg, Virginia
Roller derby leagues established in 2008
Roller derby leagues in Virginia
Women's Flat Track Derby Association Division 3
2008 establishments in Virginia